Kawang is a town in Paletwa Township, Mindat District, in the Chin State of Myanmar.

References

External links
 "Kawang Map — Satellite Images of Kawang" Maplandia

Populated places in Chin State